Edward Lee King (March 28, 1894 - September 7, 1938) was a Major League Baseball outfielder. He started his career with the 1916 Philadelphia Athletics, for which he batted .188 in 42 games. He spent most of 1917 and 1919 playing for Springfield of the Eastern League.

Sources

1894 births
1938 deaths
Major League Baseball outfielders
Philadelphia Athletics players
Boston Braves players
Baseball players from Massachusetts
Springfield Green Sox players
Springfield Ponies players
UMass Minutemen baseball players